Gerald Wayne "Jerry" Grant (January 23, 1935 – August 12, 2012) was a driver in the USAC Championship Car series. Born in Seattle, he began racing sports cars in Northern California in the early 1960s. He raced in the 1965-1977 seasons, with 54 career starts, including the Indianapolis 500 in 1965-1968, 1970 and 1972-1976.  He finished in the top ten 13 times, with his best finish in 3rd position in 1974 at Ontario.

Grant is best remembered for his bad luck at the 1972 Indianapolis 500 that cost him first victory and then second place.  He was leading the race comfortably over Mark Donohue when a punctured tire forced him to pit with 12 laps to go.  In later interviews, Grant said that he had adopted a higher line for improved handling, and this may have left him vulnerable to debris on the outside of the racing line. As Donohue went past into the lead, Grant overshot his pit and stopped at his teammate Bobby Unser's.  His mechanics changed the tire in Unser's pit, and also refueled the car—from Unser's pit tank.  Grant returned to the track and finished second to Donohue. The team of third-place finisher Al Unser filed a protest, saying that Grant had used fuel from another driver's supply.  The protest was upheld and Grant's final 12 laps were not counted, dropping him from 2nd to 12th.

Grant was the first USAC driver to break .  He accomplished the feat in qualifying at the Ontario Motor Speedway  on September 3, 1972, completing a  lap in 44.7 seconds.  however on raceday Grant's Eagle failed to complete a lap.

In addition to the controversial finish at Indianapolis in 1972, Grant suffered another famous stroke of bad luck in 1966, when his Ford GT Mk.II, with co-driver Dan Gurney behind the wheel, suffered an engine failure while leading two minutes from the end of the 12 Hours of Sebring. As at Indy, Gurney and Grant would have been awarded second place had they simply left the car where it came to rest. Instead, Gurney attempted to push the car over the finish line in violation of FIA rules, and the pair were disqualified.

Later in his career, Grant was the racing representative for Champion Spark Plugs, years later he was hired by Elton Alderman, then President of Prolong Super Lubricants to be a representative. The arraignment fell apart after Alderman did not follow through as promised.

Grant died August 12, 2012 from liver failure and diabetes at an Orange County, California hospital at the age of 77.

A memorial was held for Jerry at the Riverside International Raceway Museum in Riverside, California. Conducted by Ed Justice Jr., many of Jerry's close friends spoke, including longtime friend, co-driver and car owner, Dan Gurney.

Indianapolis 500 results

References

1935 births
2012 deaths
24 Hours of Le Mans drivers
Deaths from diabetes
Indianapolis 500 drivers
People from Irvine, California
Racing drivers from California
Racing drivers from Seattle
Trans-Am Series drivers
24 Hours of Daytona drivers
World Sportscar Championship drivers